Mohmand expedition or Mohmand campaign may refer to:

 Early minor military expeditions against the Mohmands in 1851–52
 Later minor military expeditions against the Mohmands in 1878–80
 Mohmand campaign of 1897–98, the first major military expedition
 Mohmand expedition of 1908, a smaller expedition
 Mohmand blockade, a military blockade in 1916–17
 Mohmand campaign of 1935, the second major expedition